Domestic violence in Norway is officially referred to as vold i nære relasjoner. It is defined as:

Extent
According to Norwegian police statistics, 5,284 cases of domestic violence were reported in 2008. These cases ranged from serious acts of violence such as murder and attempted murder to physical assault. The number of reported cases of domestic violence increased by 500 percent from 2005 to 2011. It is argued that the majority of cases go unrecorded. A 2011 study claimed that one in four women will experience domestic violence in their lifetime.

Government measures
In 2004 the Government established the Norwegian Centre for Violence and Traumatic Stress Studies, a research centre affiliated with the University of Oslo and with the national responsibility for violence research in Norway, including domestic violence.

Domestic violence was also addressed through the 2007 Handlingsplan mot vold i nære relasjoner. This plan was drafted as a collaboration between the Ministry of Children and Family Affairs, the Ministry of Health, the Ministry of Justice and the Ministry of Social Affairs. The stated goal of the plan was expressed as follows:

See also 
 Crime in Norway

Notes

Violence against women in Norway
Women's rights in Norway
Norway
Family in Norway